Ronald Cedric Read (19 December 1924 – 7 January 2019) was a British mathematician, latterly a professor emeritus of mathematics at the University of Waterloo, Canada. He published many books and papers, primarily on enumeration of graphs, graph isomorphism, chromatic polynomials, and particularly, the use of computers in graph-theoretical research. A majority of his later work was done in Waterloo.
Read received his Ph.D. (1959) in graph theory from the University of London.

Life and career
Ronald Read served in the Royal Navy during World War II, then completed a degree in mathematics at the University of Cambridge before joining the University College of the West Indies (later the University of the West Indies) in Jamaica as the second founding member of the Mathematics Department there. In 1970 he moved his family to Canada to take up a post as Professor of Mathematics at the University of Waterloo, Ontario, Canada.

While in Jamaica he became interested in cave exploration, and in 1957 he founded the Jamaica Caving Club.

He was an accomplished musician and played many instruments including violin, viola, cello, double bass, piano, guitar, lute, and many early music instruments, some of which he also built. He had diplomas in Theory and in Composition from the Royal Conservatory of Music in Toronto, Canada, and composed four works for orchestra and several pieces for smaller groups. Read died in January 2019 at the age of 94.

Selected papers
 An Introduction to Chromatic Polynomials. Journal of Combinatorial Theory 4 (1968) 52 - 71.
 Every One A Winner; or How to avoid isomorphism search when cataloguing combinatorial configurations. Annals of Discrete Mathematics 2, North-Holland Publishing Company (1978) 107-120.
 (With P. Rosenstiehl) On the Principal Edge Tripartition of a Graph. Annals of Discrete Mathematics 3, North-Holland Publishing Company, (1978) 195-226.
 (With W. T. Tutte), Chromatic Polynomials. Selected Topics in Graph Theory, Vol. 3 (1988) 15-42.
 (with G. F. Royle) Chromatic Roots of Families of Graphs. Graph Theory, Combinatorics and Applications. John Wiley (1991) 1009 - 1029
 Prospects for Graph-theoretical Algorithms.  Annals of Discrete Mathematics 55 (1993) 201 - 210.

Books

See also
 List of University of Waterloo people

References

1924 births
2019 deaths
20th-century English mathematicians
Alumni of the University of London
British expatriate academics in Canada
Graph theorists
Academic staff of the University of Waterloo